KF Adriatiku 2012 is a football club based in Durres, Albania. They recently competed in the Albanian Third Division. Their home ground is the Kamza Sports Complex.

References 

Adriatiku 2012
Adriatiku 2012